is a railway station in the city of Iiyama, Nagano Prefecture, Japan operated by the East Japan Railway Company (JR East).

Lines
Kami-Kuwanagawa Station is served by trains on the Iiyama Line, and is 35.4 kilometers from the starting point of the line at Toyono Station.

Station layout
The station consists of one side platform serving one bi-directional track built on an embankment. There is no station building, but only a shelter on the platform. The station is unattended.

History
Kami Kuwanagawa Station opened on 16 September 1931. With the privatization of Japanese National Railways (JNR) on 1 April 1987, the station came under the control of JR East.

Surrounding area
Chikuma River

See also
 List of railway stations in Japan

References

External links

 JR East station information 

Railway stations in Nagano Prefecture
Iiyama Line
Railway stations in Japan opened in 1931
Iiyama, Nagano